Yasnaya Polyana is a rural locality (a settlement) in Michurinsky Selsoviet, Khabarsky District, Altai Krai, Russia. The population was 49 as of 2013. There is 1 street.

Geography 
Yasnaya Polyana is located 19 km southeast of Khabary (the district's administrative centre) by road. Novoplotava is the nearest rural locality.

References 

Rural localities in Khabarsky District